Saying grace may refer to:

Grace (prayer), commonly called saying grace, a short prayer said at meals

Paintings
Saying Grace (Chardin), several 1740s paintings by Jean Simeon Chardin
Saying Grace (Rockwell), 1951 painting by American illustrator Norman Rockwell
Saying Grace (van Gogh), part of Van Gogh's Peasant Character studies